Sinoswertia is a monotypic genus of flowering plants belonging to the family Gentianaceae. The only species is Sinoswertia tetraptera.

Its native range is Western and Central China.

References

Gentianaceae
Monotypic Gentianales genera
Gentianaceae genera